San Sisto al Pino is a village in Tuscany, central Italy, administratively a frazione of the comune of Cascina, province of Pisa.

San Sisto al Pino is about 6 km from Pisa and 11 km from Cascina.

References

Bibliography 
 

Frazioni of the Province of Pisa